"Sylvia's Mother" is a 1972 single by Dr. Hook & the Medicine Show and the group's first hit song. It was written by Shel Silverstein, produced by Ron Haffkine and was highly successful in the United States, reaching #5 on the Billboard singles chart (tied with "Sexy Eyes" from the album Sometimes You Win for the band's best performing song), as well as #1 in Ireland and #2 in the United Kingdom. It spent three weeks at #1 on the Australian music charts, making it the 15th ranked single in Australia for 1972; and also reached #1 in South Africa, where it was the 3rd ranked song for the year. It appeared on the group's first album, Dr. Hook.

Song background
"Sylvia's Mother" is autobiographical, with songwriter Shel Silverstein drawing upon his unsuccessful attempt to revive a failed relationship. Silverstein had been in love with a woman named Sylvia Pandolfi, but she would later become engaged to another man and end up as a museum curator at the Museo de Arte Carrillo Gil in Mexico City. Desperate to continue the relationship, Silverstein called Pandolfi's mother, Louisa, but she told him that the love had ended.

The lyrics tell the story in much the same way: A man, despondent after learning that Sylvia, with whom he had an earlier relationship, is leaving town, tries to telephone her to say one last goodbye. However, Sylvia's mother (Mrs. Avery) tells him that Sylvia is engaged to be married, and is trying to start a new life in Galveston, Texas. She asks the man not to say anything to her because she might start crying and want to stay. She tells the man Sylvia is hurrying to catch a 9 o'clock train. She then returns to the phone conversation, thanks the (unnamed) narrator for calling. The pathos lies in the singer's awareness that Sylvia is right there with her mother, Sylvia being unaware that he is the man on the phone. Throughout the phone conversation, an operator interrupts to ask for more money ("40 cents more for the next three minutes") to continue the call.

Chart performance

Weekly charts

Year-end charts

Bobby Bare cover

In 1972, about the same time the Dr. Hook version was on the chart, country singer Bobby Bare recorded a cover version. Bare's version became a hit, reaching No. 12 on the Billboard Hot Country Singles chart that October. One of his last hit records during his stay at Mercury Records, "Sylvia's Mother" became the first of many Silverstein-penned songs Bare had success with, and would foreshadow both an entire album dedicated to Silverstein-penned songs (1973's Bobby Bare Sings Lullabys, Legends and Lies) and hit records written by Silverstein, including "Marie Laveau," "The Winner," "Rosalie's Good Eats Café", "The Mermaid", "Warm and Free" and others.

References

External links
 The real story of Sylvia's Mother
 
 Sylvia's mother at FindAGrave.com

1972 singles
Dr. Hook & the Medicine Show songs
Song recordings produced by Ron Haffkine
Songs written by Shel Silverstein
Songs about telephone calls
Songs about mothers
Cashbox number-one singles
Number-one singles in Australia
Irish Singles Chart number-one singles
Number-one singles in New Zealand
Number-one singles in South Africa
Columbia Records singles
1971 songs